Manta Ray is the debut album by Canadian singer-songwriter Nan Vernon, released in 1994. It is her only full-length album released by Anxious Records.

Track listing 

Notes
 All the tracks were produced by Dave Stewart who was credited as 'B.B. Watkins'.
 "Johnny's Birthday" is sung in German.
 "Manta Ray" includes a hidden part of sinister children's laughter near the end.

Personnel
Nan Vernon
with:
Chris Sheehan - guitar on "Lay Down Joe" and "Manta Ray"
Alex Gifford - saxophone on "Motorcycle"

Promotion 
A single "No More Lullabyes" and its music video were released in 1992. A cover version of "While My Guitar Gently Weeps" was released in 1993, and music videos for singles "Motorcycle" and "Elvis Waits" were released in 1994.

References 

1994 debut albums
Nan Vernon albums
albums produced by David A. Stewart
albums produced by Ian Stanley